Norman "Norrie" McCathie (23 March 1961 – 8 January 1996) was a Scottish professional footballer best known for time with Scottish club Dunfermline Athletic.

Signed by Dunfermline manager Pat Stanton in August 1981 from Cowdenbeath, McCathie went on to play a club record of 576 games between 1981 and 1996.

Career
McCathie made his Dunfermline debut on 24 October 1981 against Ayr United and scored his first goal three days later in a 3–1 win over Queen's Park. By 1984, McCathie had become a regular in the Dunfermline team and helped the club to successive promotions to the First Division in season 1985–86 and to the Scottish Premier Division in season 1986–87.

McCathie sustained a career-threatening injury in 1989 and went on loan to Ayr United during his rehabilitation. He returned in January and scored in his return match against Airdrieonians. He went on to play in every match for Dunfermline in the next two seasons and helped the club reach the League Cup final in season 1991–92.

Final appearance
McCathie's final appearance on the field was a 2–1 defeat against St.Mirren at St.Mirren Park on 6 January 1996. That season Dunfermline went on to gain promotion to the Scottish Premier Division.

Death
McCathie died on 8 January 1996 from carbon monoxide poisoning, aged 34, at his home in Fife. His 26-year-old girlfriend Amanda Burns also died in the tragedy. He had separated from his pregnant wife Julie in late 1995, and their daughter Jade Clare was born in March 1996 just over two months after his death. He also had two older children, Alison and Paul.

Tributes
Following McCathie's untimely death, his shirt number 4 was retired for the remainder of the 1995–96 season.

In December 1998, a stand at the club's East End Park stadium was named after him. The stand is also home to a large banner & picture of Norrie with words reading, "Lead From The Front, Never Beaten" as well as "Legend 4 Ever".

See also
 List of footballers in Scotland by number of league appearances (500+)

References

External links

Profile at DAFC.net

1961 births
1996 deaths
Scottish footballers
Cowdenbeath F.C. players
Dunfermline Athletic F.C. players
Ayr United F.C. players
Deaths from carbon monoxide poisoning
Footballers from Edinburgh
Association football central defenders
Scottish Football League players